Reshma Saujani (born November 18, 1975) is an American lawyer, politician, civil servant, and the founder of the nonprofit organization Girls Who Code, which aims to increase the number of women in computer science and close the gender employment difference in that field. She worked in city government as a deputy public advocate at the New York City Public Advocate's office. In 2009, Saujani ran against Carolyn Maloney for the U.S. House of Representatives seat from New York's 14th congressional district, becoming the first Indian-American woman to run for Congress. In 2013, she ran as a Democratic candidate for Public Advocate, coming third in the primary. Following the 2012 founding of Girls Who Code, Saujani was listed in Fortune’s 40 Under 40 list.

Early life and education
Saujani was born in Illinois. She is of Gujarati Indian descent. Saujani's parents lived in Uganda, prior to being expelled along with other persons of Indian descent in the early 1970s by Idi Amin. They settled in Chicago.

Saujani attended the University of Illinois at Urbana-Champaign, where she graduated in 1997 with majors in Political Science and Speech Communication. She attended the John F. Kennedy School of Government at Harvard University, where she received a Master of Public Policy in 1999, and Yale Law School, where she received her Juris Doctor in 2002.

Career

Finance industry
Saujani worked at the law firm Davis Polk & Wardwell LLP, where she defended securities fraud cases, and on a pro bono basis handled asylum cases. In 2005, she joined the investment firm Carret Asset Management. Subsequently, she joined Blue Wave Partners Management, a subsidiary of the Carlyle Group, the global alternative asset management firm specializing in private equity. She was an associate general counsel at Blue Wave, an equity multi-strategy hedge fund; it was closed in the aftermath of the 2008 market collapse. Immediately prior to running for Congress, Saujani was a deputy general counsel at Fortress Investment Group. In 2012, Saujani founded Girls Who Code, a nonprofit organization which works to close the gender gap in technology. In 2015, she collected a salary of $224,913 from the organization, according to Internal Revenue Service filings.

In September 2015, Reshma Saujani was named to Fortune Magazine's 40 Under 40 list. 

In March 2022, the Institute on Holistic Wealth, Founded By Best-Selling Author Keisha Blair, Announced that Saujani, was selected to be a Holistic Wealth Trailblazer, as part of the celebration of the release of Keisha Blair’s book Holistic Wealth Expanded and Updated.

Politics
Saujani founded "South Asians for Kerry" during the 2004 presidential election.

Saujani served on the National Finance Board for Hillary Clinton during Clinton's campaign for president in 2008. Following the primaries, she was named Vice-Chair of the New York delegation at the 2008 Democratic National Convention in Denver.

Saujani has also contributed to the Huffington Post and WNYC.

She has been featured on NY1, MSNBC, FOX, and CNBC.

In September 2011, she was named one of City & State'''s "40 under 40" for being a young influential member of New York City politics.

2010 House election
Saujani challenged incumbent Democratic Representative Carolyn Maloney in the 2010 House elections. Saujani's previous work for and link to Wall Street firms was seen as a liability to her credibility and acceptance by Democratic primary voters. Saujani won the support of Jack Dorsey, co-founder and chairman of Twitter; Randi Zuckerberg, director of market development for Facebook and sister of Facebook co-founder Mark Zuckerberg; Alexis Maybank, co-founder of Gilt Groupe; and Chris Hughes, co-founder of Facebook. Saujani outraised Maloney by almost a 2-to-1 margin in the last quarter of 2009, when Maloney had ceased fundraising following the death of her husband, Clifton Maloney, who in September had died unexpectedly on a mountain-climbing expedition in the Himalayas. Saujani's candidacy received the backing of prominent Upper East Side political fundraisers, including Cathy Lasry, Maureen White, and White's husband, financier Steven Rattner.

A poll commissioned in the spring of 2010 by the Maloney campaign showed Saujani trailing Maloney by more than 68 points. The same poll found Maloney to hold a favorable rating of 86%. Saujani's campaign mailed a flyer to voters implicating Maloney as one of eight House members investigated for taking donations from special interests. Maloney won the primary by receiving 81% of the vote to Saujani's 19%, winning the Manhattan, Queens, and Roosevelt Island portions of the district across the board by decisive margins. Saujani received 6,231 votes, despite her campaign's expenditure of $1.3 million, spending more than $213 for every vote she received.

Saujani's campaign was the first political campaign to use technology tools such as Square, Inc.

2013 Public Advocate election
Saujani ran for the role of New York Public Advocate in 2013, coming third in the Democratic primary. Her campaign manager in 2013 was Michael Blake, who later served as a New York State Assemblyman, and then ran for the Public Advocate seat himself in 2018.

In January 2013, Saujani's Wikipedia page was heavily edited to remove traces of Saujani working for Wall Street firms such as hedge funds. Her campaign admitted to this, arguing they did it because they disagreed with the stated facts.

 Girls Who Code 
Saujani founded Girls Who Code in 2012 after visiting schools and becoming aware of the gender disparity in computing while campaigning for Congress. Saujani was a speaker at the 2016 TED Conference, with her talk focusing on encouraging young girls to take risks and learn to program. In February 2018, Saujani launched a companion podcast of the same name to her book Brave, Not Perfect. Since launch, it has featured guests including First Lady Jill Biden, Representative Alexandria Ocasio-Cortez and others. In January 2021, she placed advertisements in The New York Times and The Washington Post calling on the Biden administration to support the passage of a “Marshall Plan for Moms” in the form of a resolution introduced by Representative Grace Meng and pass a series of financial relief executive actions benefiting mothers and women in the workforce.

Books
Saujani is the author of Women Who Don't Wait in Line: Break the Mold, Lead the Way, published by Houghton Mifflin Harcourt in 2013, and Girls Who Code: Learn to Code and Change the World, published by Viking in August 2017, and Brave, Not Perfect: Fear Less, Fail More, and Live Bolder in 2018.

She is the author of the forthcoming book Pay Up: The Future of Women and Work (and Why It’s Different Than You Think)'' expected in March 2022.

Personal life
Saujani is married to entrepreneur Nihal Mehta, who was a co-founder of ad tech startup LocalResponse and now is a co-founding partner of Eniac Ventures, a seed stage venture capital firm. Saujani is a practicing Hindu. They have two children.

See also
 Gujarati Americans
 Indians in the New York City metropolitan area

References

External links

Girls Who Code
 

Living people
American Hindus
New York (state) Democrats
Women in New York (state) politics
Asian-American people in New York (state) politics
American educators
Yale Law School alumni
University of Illinois Urbana-Champaign alumni
Harvard Kennedy School alumni
American people of Gujarati descent
American politicians of Indian descent
1975 births
Davis Polk & Wardwell lawyers
21st-century American women